PS Lymington was a passenger vessel built for the London and South Western Railway in 1893.

History

She was built by Day, Summers and Company in Southampton and launched on 6 April 1893.

She cost £6,000 and was 120 feet (37 m) long. and was used for the Yarmouth to Lymington ferry service.

She was acquired by the Southern Railway in 1923.

She was disposed of is 1929 and converted into a houseboat at Yarmouth and renamed Glengarry. Later she was used as the Norwich Sea Cadets’ training vessel Lord Nelson.

References

1893 ships
Steamships of the United Kingdom
Paddle steamers of the United Kingdom
Ships of the London and South Western Railway
Ships of the Southern Railway (UK)
Ships built in Southampton